Yolla is a rural community in north-western Tasmania, Australia. The area around Yolla is used for dairying, beef cattle, growing vegetables, opium poppies and other crops, as well as forestry and mining. Local attractions are Hellyer Gorge and the Oldina Forest Reserve.

History
Yolla was first settled in the 1880s. Camp Creek Post Office was open between 1881 and 1884. It reopened in 1905 and was renamed Yolla in 1906. The name is a Tasmanian Aboriginal word for the short-tailed shearwater or "muttonbird".  The area was originally covered by myrtle beech forest, which was gradually cleared for farming.

Climate

See also
 Yolla Football Club

References

Localities of Waratah–Wynyard Council
Towns in Tasmania